Ling Guang (born 1 March 1966) is a Chinese basketball player. She competed in the women's tournament at the 1988 Summer Olympics.

References

1966 births
Living people
Chinese women's basketball players
Olympic basketball players of China
Basketball players at the 1988 Summer Olympics
Basketball players from Shanghai
Asian Games medalists in basketball
Asian Games silver medalists for China
Basketball players at the 1990 Asian Games
Medalists at the 1990 Asian Games